Cartoon Network is a pan-Asian free to air via IPTV and pay television channel that primarily broadcasts animated series. Operated by Warner Bros. Discovery under its International division, the channel is broadcast from its headquarters in Singapore and Jakarta, Indonesia to audiences in its country of location, as well as to Hong Kong and several areas in the Asian continent. It was launched on October 6, 1994.

History

1990s 
On 6 October 1994, Turner Broadcasting System Asia Pacific launched Cartoon Network Asia on both Apstar 1 and Palapa-B2P. It operated from 6:00 a.m. to 9:00 p.m., with Turner Classic Movies Asia (formerly Turner Network Television Asia) taking the remainder of the daily schedule. During that time, Cartoon Network Asia was originally a 24-hour cable and satellite TV channel devoted to animated cartoons and classic films called TNT & Cartoon Network Asia and the service only had 4 different audio tracks including English, Mandarin, Thai and Japanese. Originally devoted to classic animated cartoons from studios such as Warner Bros., MGM and Hanna-Barbera, Cartoon Network Asia has since expanded to include more contemporary programming as well as its original productions, starting with its first original series to air in Asia in 1997 called Dexter’s Laboratory.

Sometime during the 1990s, Cartoon Network Asia launched a separate 24-hour feed of its service on the PAS-2 satellite along with TNT Asia.

On 4 January, 1999, Cartoon Network Asia began to offer Hindi-dubbed versions of its shows in addition to English, Mandarin, Cantonese, Thai, Korean, Japanese, Filipino and Malay including Scooby-Doo, Where Are You!, The Flintstones, The Jetsons, SWAT Kats: The Radical Squadron, The Mask: The Animated Series, The Addams Family, The Real Adventures of Jonny Quest, Captain Planet and certain other select programs including Garfield and Friends, The Twisted Tales of Felix the Cat, The Little Lulu Show and Crocadoo.

On 22 August 1999, Cartoon Network Asia was officially rebranded, introducing new bumpers, new original productions and a new graphical package.

2000s 
In 2000, other non-original shows were introduced. Also, throughout the early 2000s, Cartoon Network Asia began airing several more original productions.

In 2001, a programming block called Cartoon Cartoons was introduced. Cartoon Network Asia also introduced other programming blocks including Toonami, Acme Hour, Prime Time, the Boomerang block (now a TV channel), and Cartoon Network Night Shift.

On 1 July 2001, Cartoon Network Asia officially became a separate 24-hour channel along with its country-specific feeds for India, the Philippines, Taiwan, Australia and New Zealand and TCM Asia.

In 2003 and 2004, more programming blocks were added. In Early 2004, Boomerang was added to Foxtel. Many of the older cartoons migrated to the channel. In addition, Cartoon Network for a brief period would show segments of kids getting prizes during the holidays, but was canceled due to low audience. Up until mid-2004, Cartoon Network Asia had been tied with the Disney Channel as the most popular family channel in Asian continent. The removal of the older 1950's-1980's Hanna-Barbera programming from the network during the period led to a fall in average audience share during 2004 as the fans of older cartoons moved to its new sister channel Boomerang Asia.

On 1 October 2005, the channel's 'bumpers' were replaced with 3-D animation promotions that were set in a fictional location called "CN City". A well-known scene from a show was sometimes the theme. The "Cartoon Cartoons" moniker was dropped in 2006. On 31 August 2008, the bumpers and ads were updated and "Cartoon Network Theatre" was renamed into "Cartoon Network Popcorn".

2010s 
On 1 October 2011, during Amazing World of Gumball premiere, the channel introduced a new branding, logo, and slogan (It's A Fun Thing) as well as new shows (ex. Oggy and the Cockroaches) In 2012, Cartoon Network started airing all shows with the exception of Courage the Cowardly Dog and other past shows in HDTV 1080i format. In 2013, the American CN bumpers and the Asian bumpers were refreshed.

The channel was rebranded to Dimensional on October 18, 2017, along with Cinemax Asia.

2020s 
On 8 January 2022, Cartoon Network Asia, Korea, Hong Kong, and Taiwan rebranded to Redraw Your World. The video series "Craft Your World" will launch on Cartoon Network Asia and Crayola websites and social channels in the coming weeks until the end of 2022. "Redraw Your World" physical events are also taking place from February onwards in malls across the region, including Singapore, Malaysia and the Philippines.

Availability

Mainland China 
In Mainland China, Cartoon Network Asia has been available on a satellite since October 6, 1994. Broadcasting from Singapore in Standard Chinese and Cantonese (for South China), Cartoon Network Asia became the number one rated foreign-owned children's channel in Mainland China. It was also available on various CATV systems across Mainland China from the channel's launch on October 6, 1994, until the early of 2000, when it was banned for, according to an official of the SARFT, violating "relevant Chinese rules". At the time of banning, the channel had an estimated reach of 100,000 CATV subscribers. Despite the ban, Cartoon Network Asia is still available on various CATV systems across Mainland China including Beijing, Shanghai, Guangzhou and Shenzhen.

Hong Kong 
In Hong Kong, Cartoon Network Asia is available on now TV and Cable TV Hong Kong. It is broadcast in English, Standard Chinese and Cantonese.

Taiwan 
In Taiwan, Cartoon Network Asia has a country-specific feed for Taiwan and it has been available on cable and satellite on October 6, 1994. It is broadcast in both Taiwanese Mandarin and English.

South Korea 

In January 2003, Cartoon Network Asia was launched in South Korea after the discontinuation of a Cartoon Network block on Tooniverse, but only in English, as Korean laws at the time imply that channels operating outside of South Korea are forbidden to carry the Korean audio track or subtitles within South Korean territory. In 2006, JoongAng Ilbo and the Turner company established a joint venture to launch a separate Korean version of Cartoon Network and was launched in November of the same year.

Japan 

In 1995, Cartoon Network Asia was launched on various CATV systems across Japan along with TNT Asia, STAR TV and many other foreign-owned satellite TV channels across Asia.

On September 1, 1997, Cartoon Network Asia has launched a separate country-specific feed for Japan called Cartoon Network Japan. Broadcasting from Tokyo in both Japanese and English, Cartoon Network Japan became the No. 1 foreign-owned children's channel in Japan. During that time, Cartoon Network Japan had signed an exclusive contract with Sky PerfecTV! (formerly PerfecTV!), but it was expired when the channel was launched on the now-defunct DirecTV Japan in December 1997.

Thailand 
In Thailand, Cartoon Network Asia is available as a part of the TrueVisions cable and satellite channels; TrueVisions includes the pan-Asian Cartoon Network in both its Gold and Platinum packages.

On October 6, 1994, TNT & Cartoon Network Asia was launched on various CATV systems across Thailand along with TNT Asia.

Starting in 2009, a Thai audio track for promos and adverts was introduced alongside an official Thai website.

In February 2018, Cartoon Network Asia along with CNN International Asia Pacific is made available on AIS Play.

Indonesia 
In Indonesia, Cartoon Network Asia is available on First Media Gold and Platinum packages, BiG TV (affiliated with First Media) Gold and Platinum packages, MNC Vision Platinum Packages (used to be Indovision), TransVision Platinum Packages (used to be TelkomVision). and IndiKids add-on package on IndiHome.

Philippines 

Cartoon Network Asia has a country-specific feed for the Philippines since 1995 and it has been available on cable and satellite on October 6, 1994. It is broadcast in English.

Vietnam 
In Vietnam, Cartoon Network Asia used to be available in English, but in April 2014, a localized feed was launched. The line-up is identical to the pan-Asian version, but the promos are entirely in Vietnamese (In addition, the original programming is either dubbed or has Vietnamese voice-over), and the local titles of the cartoons are shown on screen, right next to Cartoon Network's logo. The Vietnamese feed is available on VTC Digital, SCTV, Viettel, Hanoi Radio-Television (HCATV), Vietnam Television (VTVcab) and FPT Play. Starting in December 2016, a Vietnamese audio track for promos and adverts was introduced.

A Vietnamese ad or other channel's promos (like Warner TV) may appear when promos are playing.

Malaysia and Brunei 
The first Malaysian broadcasting company to air Cartoon Network Asia was Astro subsidiaries of Measat Broadcasting Systems Sdn Bhd. Cartoon Network was launched on Astro on channel 616 (old channel number, had been changed in April 2020) in Malaysia, and in Brunei (Kristal-Astro) on 31 August 2006.
 The current channel number for Cartoon Network on Astro (from April 2020) is now 615 for the HD.

Before Astro launched the channel in 1996, Cartoon Network Asia was first launched on Mega TV in 1995.

Sri Lanka 
Cartoon Network Asia was formerly provided in Sri Lanka, but now  Cartoon Network HD+ India is broadcast on Dialog TV in SD format and Cartoon Network Pakistan is broadcast on PEO TV.

Programming

Programming blocks

Current

Redraw Your Summer (Seasonal Summer) 
Redraw Your Summer (formerly Best Summer Ever) is a programming block dedicated for summer that airs Cartoon Network shows and some acquired content from May to June.

Shriektober (Seasonal Fall) 
Shriektober is a programming block dedicated for Halloween that airs Cartoon Network shows and some acquired content.

So Much Christmas (Seasonal Winter)

So Much Christmas is a programming block dedicated for Christmas that airs Cartoon Network shows and some acquired content.

Cartoonito 

Cartoonito originally launched on 1 December 2012, Cartoonito launched in Asia in conjunction with its localized website. Cartoonito programming block aired on Cartoon Network from 6 to 8 AM including Baby Looney Tunes & ABC Monsters. Cartoonito was replaced by Boomerang on January 1, 2015. The brand, relaunched as a morning programming block on Cartoon Network in Japan on March 1, 2022, and in Southeast Asia and Korea on March 28 of the same year. It offers a modern approach to preschool programming, built to support each child’s unique potential with its educational framework called “Humancentric Learning”.

Former

Boomerang 

Boomerang was first shown as a programming block on Cartoon Network Asia from October 6, 1994, to March 14, 2004. A separate TV channel was available all across Asia and Oceania from March 14, 2004, until December 2012. It was replaced with Toonami; Toonami is also operated and distributed by Turner Broadcasting System Asia Pacific. However, since 1 January 2015, Boomerang has replaced Cartoonito.

Triple Jam 
Triple Jam was a programming block broadcast Best of 3 Cartoon Network shows including, Teen Titans Go!, We Bare Bears and The Amazing World of Gumball on weekdays.

Tiny TV 
Tiny TV was first shown in Asia and Oceania in June 2002 and it showed cartoons that were targeted at very young children including The Flintstone Kids, Baby Looney Tunes, Krypto the Superdog, Tom & Jerry Kids and A Pup Named Scooby-Doo.

Cartoon Network Mornings 

Cartoon Network Mornings was a morning programming block that broadcast Warner Bros. Animation and some shows which aired on Cartoonito in the US and its sister channel, Boomerang, including Mush-Mush and the Mushables, Alice and Lewis, Talking Tom and Friends, Grizzly and the Lemmings and Mr. Bean: The Animated Series on weekdays

FRIYAY 
FRIYAY was a programming block airs every Friday. It airs shows such as The Amazing World of Gumball, Craig of the Creek, Teen Titans Go! and We Bare Bears

Cartoon Network Popcorn 
Cartoon Network Popcorn was a programming block that airs movies.

Cartoon Network Classic 
Cartoon Network Classic was a programming block that airs classic shows such as Courage The Cowardly Dog, Chowder, Dexter Laboratory and others. This block was ended at the end of 2020

Laughternoons 
Laughternoons was a programming block that airs some Cartoon Network shows.

Good Morning Scooby! 
Good Morning Scooby! was programming block that airs of Scooby-Doo series. The block ended at the end of 2011.

Era Names 

 October 6, 1994 – August 22, 1999: Checkerboard Era
 1998–2005: Powerhouse Era
 2005–2008: City Era
 2008–2011: New Wave Era
 2011-2016: CHECK It Era
 2017–2021: Dimensional Era
 2018-2021: Mashup Era
 2021–present: Redraw Your World Era

See also 
 List of television stations in Southeast Asia

Notes

References

External links 
 

Cartoon Network
Warner Bros. Discovery Asia-Pacific
AsiaSat
Palapa
Children's television channels in the Asia Pacific
Mass media in Southeast Asia
Television channels and stations established in 1994
1994 establishments in Singapore
Television stations in Singapore
Television stations in Thailand
Television stations in the Philippines
Television stations in Hong Kong
Television stations in Indonesia
Television stations in Malaysia
Television stations in Vietnam
Television channels in Brunei
Television stations in Macau
Television stations in Taiwan
Television channels in South Korea
Television stations in Japan
Television stations in Australia
Television stations in New Zealand

zh:卡通頻道 (東南亞和香港)